Royal Tramp is a 2008 Chinese television series adapted from Louis Cha's novel The Deer and the Cauldron. Produced by Zhang Jizhong and Huayi Brothers, the series consists of 50 episodes, filmed in high definition. The series was first broadcast on Jiangsu TV in China in 2008 and was subsequently aired on TVB in Hong Kong and other countries.

Cast

 Huang Xiaoming as Wei Xiaobao
 Wang Chengyang as young Wei Xiaobao
 Wallace Chung as Kangxi Emperor
 Shi Lei as young Kangxi Emperor
 He Zhuoyan as Shuang'er
 Shu Chang as Princess Jianning
 Liu Zi as Fang Yi
 Liu Yun as Mu Jianping
 Cherrie Ying as A'ke
 Hu Ke as Su Quan
 Li Fei'er as Zeng Rou
 Qiao Zhenyu as Zheng Keshuang
 TAE as Liu Yizhou
 Jing Gangshan as Feng Jizhong
 He Jiayi as Jiunan
 Tan Feiling as Songgotu
 Elvis Tsui as Oboi
 Zhu Yanping as Chen Jinnan
 Hua Zi as Hai Dafu
 Gao Yuan as Empress Dowager / Mao Dongzhu
 Ning Jing as Chen Yuanyuan
 Ma Lin as Wei Chunhua
 Li Chengru as Xingchi (Shunzhi Emperor)
 Zhong Liang as Wu Yingxiong
 Tu Men as Wu Sangui
 Yu Chenghui as Feng Xifan
 Liu Xiaohu as Zhang Kangnian
 Rocky Hou as Yang Yizhi
 Wang Xiaoming as Mu Jiansheng
 Li Xintong as A'qi
 Hu Dong as Duolong
 Xiao Xiangyu as Gui Erniang
 Li Zefeng as Gui Zhong
 Shen Baoping as Gui Xinshu
 Zhao Xiaorui as Mao Shiba
 Xue Zhongrui as Prince Kang
 Yang Niansheng as Xu Tianchuan
 Liu Naiyi as Taoist Xuanzhen
 Li Ming as Qian Laoben
 Yan Guanying as Fat Monk
 Qin Weidong as Thin Monk
 Wang Jianguo as Qi Qingbiao
 Sang Weilin as Zhao Liangdong
 Chen Zhihui as Li Zicheng
 Huang Gexuan as Galdan Boshugtu Khan
 Zhang Hengping as Taoist Wugen
 Yuan Yuan as Hong Antong
 Huang Suying as Mamasan of Lichun Brothel
 Duan Duan as Ao Biao
 Tao Jixin as Liu Dahong
 Qiao Yu as Li Xihua
 Zhou Gang as Xingdian
 Zhou Xiaobin as Deng Bingchun
 Li Na as Liu Yan
 Zhao Da as Wen Youdao
 Zhao Jintao as Wen Youfang
 Sun Lihua as Ruichu
 Li Aiqin as Yunhui
 Guo Xiao'an as Deng Guan
 Xing Han as Yun Sumei
 Xi Xianfeng as Green Dragon Marshal
 Wang Jingluan as Taohua
 Yang Lin as Yu Ba
 Liu Guanlin as Jing Ji
 Zhang Chi as Huang Lizhou
 Su Mao as Lu Gaoxuan
 Lu Shigang as Guan Anji
 Zhao Gang as Xia Guoxiang
 Hou Yueqiu as Zhang Danyue
 Zhao Yang as Wang Jinbao
 Ren Baocheng as Shi Lang
 Chen Hai as Lin Xingzhu
 Zhang Gong as Hu Yizhi
 Li Jun as Deng Guang
 Ma Zijun as Huicong
 Ren Wu as Qingliang Temple abbot
 Zha Xi as Wu Zhirong
 Su Yan as Xiaoguizi
 Li Yuan as Peng Chun
 Gao Fei as Third Young Mistress Zhuang
 De Long as Gao Lijin
 Zhao Guixiang as Gu Yanwu
 Hu Qingshi as Zha Jizuo
 Chen Zhou as Lü Liuliang
 Wang Bing as Bayan
 Dong Zhigang as Yu Lin
 Shen Tian as Xing Hua
 Ye Jing as Huangfu Ge
 Yuan Ming as Rui Dong
 Zhang Kai as Wei Tongchui
 Li Chen as Wei Hutou
 Jin Wenting as Wei Shuangshuang
 Ba Tu as Wu Lishen
 Han Yueqiao as Tao Hongying
 Carrie as Sophia Alekseyevna
 Henry as Fedor Golovin

Viewership ratings

External links
 
  Royal Tramp official page on TVB's website

TVB dramas
Works based on The Deer and the Cauldron
Chinese wuxia television series
Television series set in the Qing dynasty
2008 Chinese television series debuts
2008 Chinese television series endings
2009 Hong Kong television series debuts
2009 Hong Kong television series endings
Mandarin-language television shows
Television shows based on works by Jin Yong
Jiangsu Television original programming
Television series by Huayi Brothers